Bridge No. 5151-Marshall is a concrete girder bridge with decorative metal lampposts, carrying Minnesota State Highway 19 over the Redwood River in Marshall, Minnesota, United States. It was built 1931 and was listed on the National Register of Historic Places in 1998.  Along with the nearby Bridge No. 5083-Marshall, it was nominated as a rare surviving example of the ornamental urban highway bridges built in Minnesota before World War II.

References

Buildings and structures in Lyon County, Minnesota
National Register of Historic Places in Lyon County, Minnesota
Road bridges on the National Register of Historic Places in Minnesota
Concrete bridges in the United States
Girder bridges in the United States